Catriló is a town in La Pampa Province in Argentina, it is located at the intersection of National Route 5 and Provincial Route 1, in the northeast of the province.

Town name
The name Catriló derives from the Mapuche expression that means "cut dune".

References

Populated places in La Pampa Province